Liliyana Panayotova-Ivanova (born 17 March 1956) is a Bulgarian sprinter. She competed in the 200 metres at the 1976 Summer Olympics and the 1980 Summer Olympics.

References

External links
 

1956 births
Living people
Athletes (track and field) at the 1976 Summer Olympics
Athletes (track and field) at the 1980 Summer Olympics
Bulgarian female sprinters
Bulgarian female long jumpers
Olympic athletes of Bulgaria
Place of birth missing (living people)
Friendship Games medalists in athletics
21st-century Bulgarian women
20th-century Bulgarian women